Capo Colonna (sometimes Capo Colonne or Capo della Colonne is a cape in Calabria located near Crotone. In ancient times the promontory was called Promunturium Lacinium. The modern name derives from the remaining column of the Temple of Juno Lacinia.

Temple of Juno Lacinia

The ruins of an Ancient Greek temple dedicated to Hera (Juno) are visible on the cape. The temple was said to have still been fairly complete in the 16th century, but was destroyed to build the episcopal palace at Crotone.

See also
 Capo Colonne Lighthouse

References

 See R. Koldewey and O. Puchstein, Die griechischen Tempel in Unteritalien und Sicilien (Berlin 1899, 41).

 

Headlands of Italy
Crotone
Landforms of Calabria